Parkland Beach may refer to:

Parkland Beach, Alberta
Parkland Beach, Saskatchewan